Stephanophyllites is an extinct genus of plants that lived in the Permian.

Location
In Brazil, the fossil  of species indefinite of the genus Stephanophyllites, was located on outcrop Morro Papaléo in the city of Mariana Pimentel. They are in the geopark Paleorrota in Rio Bonito Formation and date from Sakmarian at Permian. The species S. Sanpaulensis was located in the state of São Paulo.

In Argentina, the species S. Sanpaulensis was also located.

References

Prehistoric plant genera
Permian plants